Povoda is a village and municipality in the Dunajská Streda District in the Trnava Region of south-west Slovakia.

Component villages

History
The municipality was organised in 1940, when its component villages were unified under the Hungarian name Pódafa, which was Slovakized as Povoda in 1948. Until the end of World War I, all three component villages were part of Hungary and fell within the Somorja district of Pozsony County. After the Austro-Hungarian army disintegrated in November 1918, Czechoslovak troops occupied the area. After the Treaty of Trianon of 1920, the villages became officially part of Czechoslovakia. In November 1938, the First Vienna Award granted the area to Hungary and it was held by Hungary until 1945. After Soviet occupation in 1945, Czechoslovak administration returned and the villages became officially part of Czechoslovakia in 1947.

Demography 
As of 2001, 78.61% of its population were Hungarians while 18.24% were Slovaks. Roman Catholicism is the majority religion of the village, its adherents numbering 83.20% of the total population.

References

External links
Povoda-Pódafa|Facebook

Villages and municipalities in Dunajská Streda District
Hungarian communities in Slovakia